Solitaire is the seventh studio album by the Austrian symphonic metal band Edenbridge. Like its predecessor MyEarthDream, Solitaire also enlists the Czech Film Orchestra. Although the album features mainly symphonic metal, influences of power metal have also been observed.

Reception 

The album received positive reviews from the critics. The complex sound, a flawless production and the vocal abilities of singer Sabine Edelsbacher have been noted by both About.com and the German Sonic Seducer magazine. The latter also mentioned a few hints at power metal in the album and considered the overall material an aspirant for Symphonic metal song classics. The German edition of Metal Hammer praised the orchestral arrangements by Arne "Lanvall" Stockhammer and the overall musical mix of classic elements and metal.

Solitaire did not enter the Austrian charts but peaked at position 95 in Germany.

Track listing

Personnel
Sabine Edelsbacher – vocals
Lanvall – lead and rhythm guitar, keyboards, piano, bass guitar, acoustic guitar, bouzouki
Max Pointer – drums, percussion
Dominik Sebastian – guitar, classic guitar

References 

2010 albums
Edenbridge (band) albums
Napalm Records albums